is Eiko Shimamiya's third single produced by I've Sound and Geneon Entertainment label. It was released on April 16, 2008. The title track is used as the opening theme to the live-action movie for the anime series Higurashi no Naku Koro ni. The B-side "Diorama" is the ending theme to the series.

The special edition for this single was a DVD containing the PV for Wheel of fortune. And it has to be noted that this will be Shimamiya's third tie-in with the Higurashi no Naku Koro ni series.

Track listing 

Wheel of Fortune (運命の輪) -- 5:03
Composition: Kazuya Takase
Arrangement: Kazuya Takase
Lyrics: Eiko Shimamiya
ディオラマ (Diorama) —5:36
Composition: Tomoyuki Nakazawa
Arrangement: Tomoyuki Nakazawa
Lyrics: Eiko Shimamiya
Wheel of Fortune (運命の輪) -instrumental- -- 5:04
ディオラマ (Diorama) -instrumental- - 5:33

References

Charts and sales

2008 singles
Eiko Shimamiya songs
Song recordings produced by I've Sound
2008 songs
Japanese film songs